The 1996–97 Eliteserien season was the 58th season of ice hockey in Norway. Ten teams participated in the league, and Storhamar Ishockey won the championship.

Regular season

Playoffs

Relegation 
 Furuset IF - Viking IK 2:1 (4:1, 5:7, 10:4)

External links
Season on hockeyarchives.info

Norway
GET-ligaen seasons
GET